The 1935 FA Cup final was contested by Sheffield Wednesday and West Bromwich Albion at Wembley. Sheffield Wednesday won 4–2, with goals scored by Jack Palethorpe, Mark Hooper and Ellis Rimmer (2). Wally Boyes and Teddy Sandford scored West Brom's goals. It is the most recent time that the trophy has been won by Sheffield Wednesday, and would be their last major trophy win for 56 years, until they won the Football League Cup in 1991.

Match summary
West Brom went into the match as favourites even though they were below Wednesday in the table, pundits believing that they had the better forward players with Wally Boyes, W.G. Richardson and Teddy Sandford all having notched over 20 League goals for the season. The two teams had met in a League game five days earlier, on Easter Monday, and drawn 1–1 at The Hawthorns. Wednesday went into the match with a full strength squad and fielded the same starting eleven that they had for every round except the third, Ellis Rimmer having scored in every round. West Brom brought back Joe Carter, who had been absent with a knee injury since the semi-final, to replace Harry Jones. West Brom also left out Arthur Gale who had played in all six FA Cup ties that season and scored four goals from the right wing. Gale was replaced by Tommy Glidden, who was effectively shackled by Wednesday's left back Ted Catlin.

Wednesday took the lead after just two minutes. A West Brom attack broke down leaving Catlin injured, but the referee Bert Fogg played an advantage and a quick break saw Mark Hooper and Ronnie Starling combine to feed Jack Palethorpe, who hit a right foot shot into the corner of the goal. Albion however started to play some good football and equalised after 21 minutes through the youngest player on the field, 22-year-old Boyes. The diminutive left winger took a pass from Carter and hit a rising drive from the left side of the penalty area past Jack Brown. The score remained at 1–1 until half time.

The early stages of the second half saw Starling miss a chance and then have another effort cleared off the line. Starling was prominent in Wednesday re-taking the lead on 70 minutes when his pass released Hooper, who beat two men before hitting a shot past Harold Pearson that went in off the post. Within five minutes West Brom were level, as a Sandford shot was deflected into the net by Walt Millership. The limping Carter missed two good chances, hitting the post with one of them, and W. G. Richardson also missed a fine opportunity. With five minutes remaining, Rimmer chased a long through ball from Wilf Sharp and the tall winger headed the ball past Pearson and into the net, to continue his record of scoring in every round. In the final minute, Pearson parried a Hooper shot and Rimmer knocked the ball home from close range for his second goal.

Aftermath
Sheffield Wednesday have not won the FA Cup again since their 1935 triumph; their only major trophy during that time was the Football League Cup in 1991. By this date, there were just two members of Wednesday's FA Cup winning team still alive; captain Ronnie Starling, who died later that year at the age of 82, and Jack Surtees, who died in July 1992 at the age of 81. The last surviving player from the game, Albion's Teddy Sandford, died in May 1995 at the age of 84.

Match details

Match rules
90 minutes.
30 minutes of extra-time if necessary.
Replay if scores still level.

Road to Wembley

References

External links
Video clip of final
Match report at www.fa-cupfinals.co.uk
FA Cup Final lineups
FA Cup Final kits 1930–1939

FA Cup Finals
FA Cup Final
FA Cup Final 1935
FA Cup Final 1935
FA Cup Final
FA Cup Final